Ragnar Olsen (13 March 1914 – 9 July 1990) was a Norwegian racewalker who competed in the 1952 Summer Olympics.

References

1914 births
1990 deaths
Norwegian male racewalkers
Olympic athletes of Norway
Athletes (track and field) at the 1952 Summer Olympics
Athletes from Oslo
20th-century Norwegian people